Sarah Keeton Campbell (born 1982) is an American attorney and judge serving as a justice of the Tennessee Supreme Court since 2022.

Background and career 

Campbell was raised in Rogersville, Tennessee, where her family moved when she was eleven years old. She earned her high school diploma from Cherokee High School in 2000. In 2004, after winning election as President of the Student Government, Campbell earned a Bachelor of Arts, summa cum laude, from the University of Tennessee. She graduated from Duke University School of Law in 2009, magna cum laude, and earned a Master of Public Policy from the Sanford School of Public Policy the same year.

Following law school, Campbell served as a law clerk to Judge William H. Pryor Jr. of the United States Court of Appeals for the Eleventh Circuit and Associate Justice Samuel Alito of the Supreme Court of the United States.

Campbell then worked as an associate at Williams & Connolly until 2015.

Campbell joined the Tennessee Attorney General's office in 2015, where she served as associate solicitor general and special assistant to the attorney general.

Judicial service 

Governor of Tennessee Bill Lee nominated Campbell to the Tennessee Supreme Court on January 12, 2022. She was confirmed by the General Assembly and sworn in on February 10, 2022.

See also 
 List of law clerks of the Supreme Court of the United States (Seat 8)

References

External links 

1982 births
Living people
21st-century American judges
21st-century American women lawyers
21st-century American lawyers
21st-century American women judges
Duke University School of Law alumni
Federalist Society members
Justices of the Tennessee Supreme Court
Law clerks of the Supreme Court of the United States
People from LaFollette, Tennessee
Sanford School of Public Policy alumni
Tennessee lawyers
Tennessee Republicans
University of Tennessee alumni